Islamic Republic of Iran Cricket Association is the governing body for cricket in Iran. In 2017, it became an associate member of the International Cricket Council.

Administration

Pre-2010
Prior to 2010, Cricket did not have its own independent governing body, it was administered together with Baseball and Softball.

In 2009 there were two chiefs of cricket in Iran.

Federation of Cricket, Baseball and Softball: Hossein Sadegh Abedin
Cricket Council:  Juggoo Sawhney

Post-2010

President:
Afshin Heidari 2010-2015
Mohammad Hassan Alemi (Caretaker:  2015-2016), July 2016-

General Secretary:
Saeed Behrozi 2010-2015
Hoda Mohammad Jafar (Caretaker:  2015-2016), July 2016-

Head of International Relations:
Monir Habibi 2010-2015
Armin Salehi 2015-

Development
ICC Development Officer:
 Iqbal Sikander 2006-

External links
 Current official website
 Previous official website

References

Cricket administration
Cricket in Iran
Cricket
2010 establishments in Iran